Trickster was the first album released by Kidneythieves, on July 28, 1998. The album was released with the single "S+M (A Love Song)", as well as "Taxicab Messiah" which had a music video. It was rereleased in 2004 as Trickstereprocess (see below).

Track listing 

 Taxicab Messiah - 4:20
 S+M (A Love Song) - 3:33
 Swanmate - 1:04
 Feathers - 3:39
 Trickster - 4:35
 Creature - 4:30
 K - 4:05
 Pretty - 5:22
 Layers - 3:50
 Pleasant - 3:35
 Mustard Seed - 5:17

Trickstereprocess 

Trickstereprocess is a 2004 re-release of the first CD from the Kidneythieves, completely digitally remastered. It includes five new bonus tracks. It also includes a bonus DVD that includes never before seen concert and rehearsal footage, as well as Kidneythieves music videos.

Track listing 

CD:
 Taxicab Messiah - 4:20
 S+M (A Love Song) - 3:33
 Swanmate - 1:04
 Feathers - 3:39
 Trickster - 4:35
 Creature - 4:30
 K - 4:05
 Pretty - 5:22
 Layers - 3:50
 Pleasant - 3:35
 Mustard Seed - 5:17
 Veteran - 3:58
 Red & Violet - 3:20
 Taxicab Messiah (live) - 4:25
 Pleasant (live) - 3:37
 Before I'm Dead (acoustic) 3:47

DVD:
red & violet [music video]
red & violet [multi-angle music video]
red & violet [boomerang-effect music video] 
black bullet [live]
taxicab messiah [live]
before i'm dead [live]
glitter girl [live]
zerospace [live]
dyskrasia [live]
zerospace [music video]
taxicab messiah [music video]
credits

Notes 

 Some of the songs from this album were featured in the video game Deus Ex: Invisible War. These songs were performed by the in-game character, international pop star NG Resonance (voiced by lead vocalist Free Dominguez). (Tracks: 1 - 5, 9 & 10)

References

External links 

 
 

1998 albums
2004 albums
Kidneythieves albums